George C. Dromgold (July 14, 1893 – April 9, 1948) was an actor and writer, who wrote a book about his South Seas exploration.

Early years
George Dromgold was the son of R. W. Dromgold, a Los Angeles businessman, real estate investor, and member of the Los Angeles City Council, and Nellie Squire Dromgold. George Dromgold worked as a salesman, lived for a time in Honolulu, and entered movies in 1914. He received his first screenplay credit in 1927.

Later career
In 1933, Dromgold and James B. Shackelford traveled to the Great Barrier Reef and Papua, spending three months at Fiji. At Suva, they observed and analyzed fire-walking. Dromgold wrote a book, Two Lugs on a Lugger, with photographs by Shackelford, describing their adventures.

Selected filmography
In Wrong (1919)
Go and Get It (1920)
Through the Back Door (1921)
Minnie (1922)
Fools First (1922)
 The Lying Truth (1922)
Waking Up the Town (1925)
 Polly of the Movies (1927)
 Ragtime (1927)
Love Over Night (1928)
 Marked Money (1928)
 Celebrity (1928)
 Square Shoulders (1929)

References

External links

1893 births
1948 deaths
Male actors from Los Angeles
Writers from Los Angeles